Manipur University is a central university located in Imphal, Manipur, India. It was established on 5 June 1980, under the Manipur University Act, 1980 (Manipur Act 8 of 1980), as a teaching cum-affiliating university with territorial jurisdiction over the state of Manipur. It was converted into a central university under the Manipur University Act, 2005 w.e.f. 13 October 2005.

Campus
The university is in Canchipur, about 7 km from Imphal, the capital city of Manipur, India.

Organisation and administration

Governance
The visitor of the university is the president of India and the chief rector is the Governor of Manipur. , the chancellor is Nachane Dilip Madhukar and the vice-chancellor (in-charge) is Amar Yumnam.

Affiliated colleges
The University has 102 affiliated colleges and one constituent college, Manipur Institute of Technology.
Notable colleges include:
Biramangol College
Chanambam Ibomcha College, Bishnupur
Churachandpur Government College
Don Bosco College, Maram
Hill College, Tadubi
Ideal Girl's College, Imphal
Imphal College
Jiri College, Jiribam
Kha-Manipur College
Kamakhya Pemton College
Liberal College, Imphal
Lilong Haoreibi College
The Maharaja Bodhachandra College, Imphal
Manipur College
Manipur Institute of Technology
Mayai Lambi College
Modern College, Imphal
Moirang College
Nongmeikapam Gopal College, Imphal
Nambol L. Sanoi College
Oriental College, Imphal
Pettigrew College
Presidency College, Motbung
Rayburn College
Regional Institute of Medical Sciences
Standard College, Kongba
Tamenglong College
Thoubal College
United College, Lambung
Yangambam Kumar College, Wangjing
Moreh College

Centres
 Computer Centre
 Educational Multimedia Research Centre
 The Center for Manipur Studies
 Centre for Developmental Studies: conducted three-month intensive diploma/certificate course as Basic-I and three-month intensive diploma course as Basic-II in Japanese language from time to time.

Schools
The university has eight schools:
 Education
 Humanities
 Human & Environmental Sciences
 Life Sciences
 Mathematical & Physical Sciences
 Social Science
 Medical Sciences
 Engineering

References

External links

 
Universities in Manipur
Central universities in India
Education in Imphal
1980 establishments in Manipur
Educational institutions established in 1980